Camp Newton D. Baker was a United States Army post located near El Paso, Texas. The post was in operation from 1916 to 1920. It was used as a mobilization center for border patrols and as a Signal Corps training center. The post was named after Secretary of War Newton D. Baker.

References

Texas forts

Closed installations of the United States Army